Lectionary 18, designated by siglum ℓ 18 (in the Gregory-Aland numbering). It is a Greek manuscript of the New Testament, on vellum leaves. Palaeographically it has been assigned to the 12th-century.

Description 

The codex contains Lessons from the Gospels of John, Matthew, Luke lectionary (Evangelistarium), with numerous lacunae. The text is written in Greek minuscule letters, on 276 parchment leaves, 2 columns per page, 21-24 lines per page. 
Beginning of lectionary in John 4:53.

It was added to the list of the New Testament manuscripts by Johann Jakob Wettstein. It was partially examined by Mill (Bodleianus 4) and Griesbach.

The manuscript is sporadically cited in the critical editions of the Greek New Testament (UBS3).

Currently the codex is located in the Bodleian Library (Laud. Gr. 32) in Oxford.

See also 

 List of New Testament lectionaries
 Biblical manuscript
 Textual criticism

Notes and references

Bibliography 
 

Greek New Testament lectionaries
12th-century biblical manuscripts
Bodleian Library collection